Jenny Williams (born 1939) is an author and academic at Dublin City University. She earned a Bachelor of Arts degree in German from Queen's University Belfast in 1974 and a PhD in Medieval Historiography and Heroic Literature in 1979. Until 2007 she was the head of Dublin City's School of Applied Language and Intercultural Studies.

Selected works

 Etzel der riche, 1981
 Language, Education and Society in a Changing World, Multilingual Matters, 1996
 More Lives Than One: A Biography of Hans Fallada, Libris, 1998
 The Map. A Guide to Doing Research in Translation Studies, St. Jerome, 2002
 Mehr Leben als eins: Hans Fallada: Eine Biographie, Aufbau-Verlag, 2002
 Die Provinz im Leben und Werk von Hans Fallada, Individuell, 2005

References

External links 

 

Academics of Dublin City University
Living people
1939 births